Ken Delaland (born 1 April 1942) is a former  Australian rules footballer who played with North Melbourne in the Victorian Football League (VFL).

Notes

External links 

Living people
1942 births
Australian rules footballers from Victoria (Australia)
North Melbourne Football Club players
Redan Football Club players